
Year 702 (DCCII) was a common year starting on Sunday (link will display the full calendar) of the Julian calendar. The denomination 702 for this year has been used since the early medieval period, when the Anno Domini calendar era became the prevalent method in Europe for naming years.

Events 
 By place 

 Europe 
 Hedan II, duke of Thuringia, completes the circular Marienkirche, in Fortress Marienberg near Würzburg (Germany).

 Arabian Empire 
 Arab conquest of Armenia: Large-scale Armenian rebellion against Muslim rule breaks out, with Byzantine support. 
 Muslim-Arabs under Musa ibn Nusayr conquer Tangier and Sous, taking control of all Morocco (approximate date). 
 Ethiopian (Axumite) raiders occupy the port of Jeddah (modern Saudi Arabia).

 Mesoamerica 
 February 20 – K'inich Kan B'alam II, ruler (ajaw) of Palenque, dies after an 18-year reign. He is succeeded by his brother K'inich K'an Joy Chitam II.

 By topic 

 Religion 
 Berhtwald, archbishop of Canterbury, calls the Council of Austerfield to decide the rights of Wilfrid, some-time bishop of York. He is offered Ripon Abbey if he will relinquish his claims as bishop. Wilfrid rejects this offer and appeals to Rome.

Births 
 Ja'far al-Sadiq, sixth Shī‘ah Imām and Muslim scholar (d. 765)
 Ōnakatomi no Kiyomaro, Japanese nobleman (d. 788)

Deaths 
 Al-Muhallab ibn Abi Sufra, Arab general and governor of Basra
 Berlinda of Meerbeke, Frankish nun and saint (approximate date)
 Chen Zi'ang, Chinese poet and official of the Tang Dynasty (b. 661)
 K'inich Kan B'alam II, ruler of Palenque (b. 635)
 Liutpert, king of the Lombards
 Muiredach Muillethan, king of Connacht (Ireland)
 Ōku, Japanese princess (b. 661)

References